Pillsbury Wesley Nyirenda was a Zambian politician and the first elected Speaker of the National Assembly of Zambia after the it was renamed from Legislative Council of Northern Rhodesia. He also as a member of parliament for Fort Jameson from 1964 to 1973 before the Seat was abolished and split into Chipata East, Chipata North and Chipata West. He was also the indigenous Zambian to be President of NOCZ taking over from George Crane in 1968.

References 

1924 births
Speakers of the National Assembly of Zambia
2009 deaths